Mary Cavendish may refer to:
Mary Talbot, Countess of Shrewsbury  (1556–1632), née Mary Cavendish
Mary Cavendish, Duchess of Devonshire (1895–1988)
Mary Cavendish, the maiden name of the wife of John Fane, 7th Earl of Westmorland